The 2009 Georgetown Hoyas football team was an American football team that represented Georgetown University in the 2009 NCAA Division I FCS football season. The team was led by Kevin Kelly, in his fourth season as head coach. The Hoyas played their home games at Multi-Sport Field in Washington, D.C.  Georgetown failed to win a game, a first since 1885. However, they still filled their stadium past capacity for half their home games.

Schedule

References

Georgetown
Georgetown Hoyas football seasons
College football winless seasons
Georgetown Hoyas football